Girls in the Night is an American film noir directed by Jack Arnold. Released by Universal Pictures on January 15, 1953, the film stars Harvey Lembeck, Joyce Holden and Glenda Farrell. A family's efforts to move into a better neighborhood are hampered when their son is accused of killing a blind man.

Plot
Hannah Haynes, a pretty girl who competes in a beauty contest, dreams of moving away from her New York slum neighborhood. Her older brother Chuck, who has a chance to land a new job on Long Island, is hit by a car and needs to recover first.

Hannah frustrates her boyfriend by agreeing to a date with a hoodlum named Irv Kellener, which causes a fight between the men and makes the evil schemer Vera Schroeder jealous. Chuck and his girlfriend Georgia, who does seductive dances to entice men to throw coins to her, become so desperate that they steal from a beggar who is pretending to be blind.

Anticipating their plot, Irv arrives there first but is caught by the beggar and shoots him. Vera hides the gun and provides an alibi. Chuck and Georgia later execute their plan and steal more than $600, unaware that their victim is dead. Vera blackmails them, demanding $2,000 to prevent her from snitching to the police.

The principals confront each another in a warehouse, where Irv kisses Hannah and infuriates Vera. The police arrive, Irv runs and he is accidentally electrocuted. Chuck and Georgia are set free after returning the stolen money.

Cast
 Harvey Lembeck as Chuck Haynes
 Joyce Holden as Georgia Codray
 Glenda Farrell as Alice Haynes 
 Leonard Freeman as Joe Spurgeon 
 Patricia Hardy as Hannah Haynes
 Jaclynne Greene as Vera Schroeder
 Don Gordon as Irv Kellener
 Anthony Ross as Charlie Haynes
 Emile Meyer as Police Officer Kovacs (as Emile G. Meyer)
 Susan Odin as Hilda Haynes
 Tommy Farrell as Frankie (as Tommie Farrell)
 Paul E. Burns as 'Blind' Fred Minosa
 John Eldredge as Judge 
 Alan Dexter as Police Lt. Meyers
 Charles Cane as McGinty

References

External links
 
 
 

1953 films
Film noir
1953 crime drama films
American crime drama films
American black-and-white films
Universal Pictures films
1950s English-language films
1950s American films